Narcissistic injury, also known as "narcissistic wound" or "wounded ego" are emotional traumas that overwhelm an individual's defense mechanisms and devastate their pride and self worth. In some cases the shame or disgrace is so significant that the individual can never again truly feel good about who they are and this is sometimes referred to as a "narcissistic scar"."

Freud maintained that "losses in love" and "losses associated with failure" often leave behind injury to an individual's self-regard.

Treatment
Adam Phillips has argued that, contrary to what common sense might expect, therapeutic cure involves the patient being encouraged to re-experience "a terrible narcissistic wound" – the child's experience of exclusion by the parental alliance – in order to come to terms with, and learn again, the diminishing loss of omnipotence entailed by the basic "facts of life".

Signals of narcissistic injury
A narcissistic injury will oftentimes not be noticeable at first sight. Narcissistic injuries, or narcissistic wounds, are likely a result of criticism, loss, or even a sense of abandonment. Those diagnosed with narcissistic personality disorder will come off as excessively defensive and attacking when facing any sort of criticism. While the average person would likely react by expressing vulnerability, a person dealing with a narcissistic wound will do the opposite, causing them to come off as narcissistic, despite feeling hurt inside. The reaction of a narcissistic injury is a cover-up for the real feelings of one who faces these problems. 

To others, a narcissistic injury may seem as if the person is gaslighting or turning the issue back onto the other person. A person may come off as manipulative and aggressive because they refuse to accept anything they are told that they do not want to hear. It is important for those dealing with narcissistic wounds to make it clear to those who they attack with their words that this is indeed a disorder, rather than an act of insult towards another person.

Children who are taught that failure leads to less love and affection are more likely to become obsessed with perfection and furthermore are more likely to develop narcissistic personality disorder. The importance of self love and unconditional love need to be stressed when raising children to show them that their feelings are always valid, no matter the situation, nor how well or poorly they perform.

Sigmund Freud's concept of what in his last book he called "early injuries to the self (injuries to narcissism)" was subsequently extended by a wide variety of psychoanalysts. Karl Abraham saw the key to adult depressions in the childhood experience of a blow to narcissism through the loss of narcissistic supply. Otto Fenichel confirmed the importance of narcissistic injury in depressives and expanded such analyses to include borderline personalities.

Edmund Bergler emphasized the importance of infantile omnipotence in narcissism, and the rage that follows any blow to that sense of narcissistic omnipotence; Annie Reich stressed how a feeling of shame-fueled rage, when a blow to narcissism exposed the gap between one's ego ideal and reality; while Jacques Lacan linked Freud on the narcissistic wound to Lacan on the narcissistic mirror stage.

Finally, object relations theory highlights rage against early environmental failures that left patients feeling bad about themselves when childhood omnipotence was too abruptly challenged.

 Becoming defensive. When a narcissist's feelings are hurt, they are likely to react with hostility and tend to hold grudges. This is due to having a poor understanding of the emotional responses towards others. They lack empathy when hurting others' feelings due to their thought processing. They do not like confrontation. It is their high ego that needs to be fulfilled but deep down the cause of it is due to insecurities within themselves. When a narcissist's wants are challenged, they can act out through anger. This can stem from experiences of abuse, so they project their internalized trauma onto others.
 Narcissists lack self confidence, which projects on to relationships. Jealousy roots in neurotic insecurity. Examples of possessiveness include jealousy of a person's attention being taken away by another, and thoughts of worry that someone will take one's partner away. Their high sense of possessiveness root from a high degree of jealousy. Their possessiveness may lead them to be abusive towards their partners and friends, as well.
 Withdrawal can trigger an emotional reaction when a narcissist experiences a major setback. This collapse competes against the external validation they think they are entitled to and in return causes them emotional pain that they express as rage. A setback causes them to feel intensely frustrated.
 Extreme mood swings. Rages of outburst or silence are commonly seen in people with narcissistic personality disorder. Some experiences that can affect this are threats to their self-esteem or when they are not given the attention or wants they think they deserve. Mood swings may be triggered when a narcissist's perception is confronted with contrary beliefs and so may respond with anger.
 Feelings of power imbalance, narcissists tend to suffer from strong feelings of inferiority and so have a hard time convincing themselves that they have achieved enough. A narcissist only demands what they want without concern for the other. In a relationship, the partner of the narcissist may experience gaslighting, ghosting, and manipulation.

Perfectionism

Narcissists are often pseudo-perfectionists and create situations in which they are the center of attention. The narcissist's attempts at being seen as perfect are necessary for their grandiose self-image. If a perceived state of perfection is not reached, it can lead to guilt, shame, anger or anxiety because the subject believes that they will lose the admiration and love of other people if they are imperfect.

Because some children are raised to believe that love is conditional, obsession with being perfect becomes routine for them. As a result, when failing in any aspect of life, the child will feel as if they are no longer accepted, causing a narcissistic injury. 

Examples of reasons why children would show narcissistic injury due to perfectionism include failing exams, losing in competitions, being denied acceptance, disagreement in conversation with others, and constructive criticism. 

Behind such perfectionism, self psychology would see earlier traumatic injuries to the grandiose self.

Criticism

Wide dissemination of Kohut's concepts may at times have led to their trivialization. Neville Symington points out that "You will often hear people say, 'Oh, I'm very narcissistic,' or, 'It was a wound to my narcissism.' Such comments are not a true recognition of the condition; they are throw-away lines. To really recognize narcissism in oneself is profoundly distressing and often associated with denial."

See also
 
 Defense mechanism
 Humiliation
 Narcissistic mortification
 Narcissistic withdrawal

References

Further reading

Books
 Cooper J & Maxwell N. Narcissistic Wounds: Clinical Perspectives (1995)
 Levin JD. Slings and Arrows: Narcissistic Injury and Its Treatment (1995)

Narcissism
Psychoanalytic terminology